Svetozar Miletić (22 February 1826 – 4 February 1901) was a Serbian lawyer, journalist, author and politician who served as the mayor of Novi Sad between 1861 and 1862 and again from 1867 to 1868.

Family 
Miletić's ancestor was Mileta Zavišić, who came to Bačka from Kostajnica (present day Croatia) near the border of Bosnia where he led a company of three hundred men and fought against the Ottomans for thirty two years. Because the Ottomans wanted to punish him after they signed a peace treaty with the Austrians, Mileta moved to Bačka and changed his last name to Miletić. Mileta's son Sima, who was educated to be a merchant in Novi Sad, had fifteen sons and three daughters. Avram Miletić, the oldest of Sima's sons and grandfather of Svetozar Miletić, was a merchant and songwriter best known for writing the earliest collection of urban lyric poetry in the Serbian language. The second son of Avram Miletić, also named Sima like his grandfather, was a boot-maker and the father of Svetozar Miletić. Svetozar Miletić was the oldest of seven children born to Sima and Teodosija (née Rajić) Miletić in the village of Mošorin in Šajkaška, the Serbian Military Frontier, on 22 February 1826. His son-in-law Jaša Tomić, who was a publicist and leader of the Serbian radicals in Vojvodina, took up Miletić's mantle at the turn of the century.

Works

 Na Tucindan (1860; Before Christmas)
 Istočno pitanje (1863; The Eastern Question)
 Značaj i zadatak srpske omladine (1866, The importance and the task of the Serbian Youth movement)
 Federalni dualizam (1866; Federal dualism)
 Osnova programa za srpsku liberalno-opozicionu stranu (1869; The basic program of the Serbian liberal-opposition party)
 O obrazovanju ženskinja (1871; On the education of women)

Legacy

He is included in The 100 most prominent Serbs.

A feature film about Miletić's life titled "Ime naroda" was produced in 2020.

See also
 History of Vojvodina
 Politics of Vojvodina

References

Bibliography

 Jovan Mirosavljević, Brevijar ulica Novog Sada 1745–2001, Novi Sad, 2002.
 Vasa Stajić, "Svetozar Miletic" in The Slavonic Review, 1928, p. 106–113.

1826 births
1901 deaths
20th-century Serbian people
People from Titel
Mayors of Novi Sad
People of the Revolutions of 1848
Vojvodina under Habsburg rule
Politicians of Vojvodina
Austro-Hungarian Serbs